Sitana fusca, the dark sitana, is a species of agamid lizard endemic to Nepal. Only known from Bardibas (Mahottari District, 316 m)

References

Other references
 Cuvier, G. J. L. N. F. D. 1829 Le Règne Animal Distribué d'après son Organisation, pour servir de base à l'Histoire naturelle des Animaux et d'introduction à l'Anatomie Comparée. Nouvelle Edition. Vol. 2. Les Reptiles. Déterville, Paris, i-xvi, 1-406
 Jerdon,T.C. 1870 Notes on Indian Herpetology. P. Asiatic Soc. Bengal March 1870: 66-85
 Kelaart, Edward Fred 1854 Catalogue of reptiles collected in Ceylon. Ann. Mag. Nat. Hist. (2) 13: 137-140

External links
 

Sitana
Endemic fauna of Nepal
Reptiles of Nepal
Reptiles described in 1998